Darian Hagan (born February 1, 1970) is a former American football and Canadian football player, who, from 2005 to 2022, was an assistant coach of the University of Colorado Buffaloes football team.

College career
As an option quarterback at Colorado from 1988 to 1991, Hagan produced impressive offensive statistics operating coach Bill McCartney's "I-Bone" offense.  Due to veteran quarterback Sal Aunese being stricken with cancer, he took over the starting duties as a sophomore.  When Aunese died, Hagan and the rest of the Buffaloes dedicated their season to their fallen comrade.  In that 1989 season, he burst on the college football scene, and became the sixth player in the history of NCAA Division I-A to gain more than 1,000 yards passing and more than 1,000 yards rushing in the same season. He was the starting quarterback in 1990 when Colorado won the NCAA Division I-A national football championship, and in 1989 to 1991 when Colorado was the Big Eight Conference champions. His record as quarterback for Colorado was 28–5–2 (20–0–1 in the Big Eight). In Heisman Trophy voting he was 5th in 1989 with 242 points, 17th in 1990 with 17 points and 20th in 1991 with 12 points.

Hagan was inducted into the University of Colorado Athletic Hall of Fame in 2002.  He is also considered by many alumni as the best football player in CU history. He finished his career with 3,801 passing yards and 2,007 rushing yards.

Professional career
After college, Hagan was drafted by the San Francisco 49ers in the ninth round of the 1992 NFL Draft, but never played for the team. He played five years in the Canadian Football League for three teams:  the Toronto Argonauts (1993–94), the Las Vegas Posse (1994), and the Edmonton Eskimos (1995–96). He mostly played as a defensive back and on special teams.

Coaching career
Before his last season, he graduated from Colorado with a bachelor's degree in sociology. When his professional football career ended, Hagan turned to jobs in marketing and then in coaching. He became the defensive technical intern in 2004 for Colorado. The following year, he was hired by Gary Barnett as an offensive assistant coach. In 2006, he was one of only two assistant coaches kept by new head coach Dan Hawkins as the running backs assistant coach where he coached through the 2022 season.

On January 27, 2023, following the hiring of Deion Sanders as Colorado's new head football coach, Sanders announced he would be retaining Hagan, giving him the new title "Executive Director, Community Engagement & Outreach/Football Ambassador" Hagan, along with Director of Player Personnel Chandler Dorrell, were the only two members retained by Sanders from Colorado's 2022 staff.

References

1970 births
Living people
American football quarterbacks
Canadian football defensive backs
Colorado Buffaloes football coaches
Colorado Buffaloes football players
Edmonton Elks players
Las Vegas Posse players
People from Lynwood, California
Players of American football from California
Sportspeople from Los Angeles County, California
Toronto Argonauts players